İyd-i Milli is a national holiday that started to be celebrated in the Ottoman Empire on 23 July, the date of the declaration of the Second Constitutional Era, since 1909. The celebration of İyd-i Milli, the only national holiday in the Ottoman Empire, continued after the establishment of Turkey in 1923, and after it was celebrated for the last time in 1934, it was abolished with the law adopted on May 27, 1935.

History 
The issue of establishing a national holiday in the country first came to the fore upon the application of Mehmed Ziya Bey, an officer of the Ministry of Education, when the relevant motion was read by Member of parliament of İzmir Ahmed Müfid Bey at the session of the Parliament on January 21, 1909. While this proposal was being discussed at the parliamentary session on January 26, 1909, Istanbul deputy Hüseyin Cahit Bey suggested that the 23rd of July, when the Second Constitutional Monarchy was declared, be used as a national holiday instead of the establishment of the state. As a result of the voting in the assembly, it was accepted to send the issue to the Layiha Committee. In the session of the Assembly dated 1 June 1909, it was decided to use the 23rd of July as a holiday after the mandate from the Layiha Council was read and put to the vote. This decision was then presented to the Grand Vizier Hüseyin Hilmi Pasha, and with the decision of the Council of Ministers dated 30 June 1909, the memorandum for the approval of the issue of holding official celebrations on 23 July was sent to the Presidency of the Parliament. The bill, which was read in the first session of the Parliament of Parliament held on July 5, 1909, was accepted and enacted. The decree in this direction was published in the newspaper Takvim-i Vekayi dated 6 July 1909.

References 

 

Ottoman culture
Public holidays in Turkey
July observances